Chopper City in the Ghetto is the fourth studio album by  American rapper B.G. released April 20, 1999, on Cash Money Records and Universal. It spawned the top 40 hit "Bling Bling". The album contains production by Mannie Fresh and appearances by Baby, The Big Tymers, Lil Wayne and Juvenile.

Commercial performance
It debuted at  number 9 on the Billboard 200 for first week sales of over 140,000 copies, and was certified  Platinum by the Recording Industry Association of America on December 23, 1999 with over one million copies sold in the United States, making it B.G.'s best selling album of his solo career, and with Cash Money Records. The album has sold over 1.8 million copies in the United States.

Track listing

Charts

Weekly charts

Year-end charts

Certifications

References 

1999 albums
B.G. (rapper) albums
Cash Money Records albums